From a Whisper to a Scream may refer to:

 "From a Whisper to a Scream", a 1970 song by Allen Toussaint from the album Toussaint
 From a Whisper to a Scream, a 1971 album by Esther Phillips
 "From a Whisper to a Scream" (song), a 1981 song by Elvis Costello
 From a Whisper to a Scream (film), a 1987 horror film
 "From a Whisper to a Scream" (Grey's Anatomy), an episode of Grey's Anatomy

See also
 "Whisper to a Scream", a 1983 song by The Icicle Works